Pohjavaara is a village in the municipality of Sotkamo in Kainuu, Finland. There are many organic farmers in village and the village is particularly known its potatoes. Pohjavaara's postal code is 88490.

There are also school (Pohjavaaran koulu) in village where is classes 1–6. Three teacher and 45 children working in term 2007–2008 in school.

References 

Villages in Finland
Sotkamo